The 1968 Connecticut Huskies football team represented the University of Connecticut in the 1968 NCAA College Division football season.  The Huskies were led by third-year head coach John Toner, and completed the season with a record of 4–6.

Schedule

References

Connecticut
UConn Huskies football seasons
Yankee Conference football champion seasons
Connecticut Huskies football